Huizhou District is a district of Huangshan City, Anhui province, People's Republic of China. It was carved out from Shexian County after the 1987 renaming of the entire region from Huizhou to Huangshan City.

Administrative divisions
Huizhou District has jurisdiction over 4 towns and 3 townships.
Towns

Townships
Qiashe Township
Fuxi Township
Yangcun Township

References

County-level divisions of Anhui
Huangshan City